Gardner is a male given name derived from Gardner (surname).

Gardner as first name
Gardner Ackley (1915–1998), American economist
Gardner Dozois (1947-2018), American science fiction author and editor
Gardner Fox (1911–1986), American comic book writer
Gardner McKay (1932–2001), American actor
Gardner Minshew (born 1996), American football player
Gardner Read (1913-2005), American composer
 Gardner Williams (swimmer), American freestyle swimmer
 Gardner D. Williams, American politician
 Gardner F. Williams, American mining engineer and author
Gardner R. Withrow (1892–1964), American politician

Gardner as middle name
Edward Gardner Lewis (1869–1950), American publisher and founder of utopian colonies
John Gardner Coolidge (1863–1936), American diplomat, author and collector
Sir John Gardner Wilkinson (1797–1875), English Egyptologist
Joseph Gardner Swift (1783–1865), American army officer
Josiah Gardner Abbott (1814–1891), American politician
Morgan G. Bulkeley (1837–1922), Governor of Connecticut
Sir Prescott Gardner Hewett (1812–1891), English surgeon
William Gardner Hale (1849–1928), American classical scholar
Paul Gardner Allen (1953–2018), co-founder of Microsoft

See also
 Gardner (disambiguation)
 Gardner (surname)

Given names originating from a surname